Keith Piper may refer to:

Keith Piper (artist) (born 1960), British artist
Keith Piper (cricketer) (born 1969), English cricketer
Keith W. Piper (1921–1997), American football coach